The men's 50 metre running target was a shooting sports event held as part of the Shooting at the 1984 Summer Olympics programme. The competition was held on July 31, 1984 at the shooting ranges in Los Angeles. 23 shooters from 15 nations competed.

Results

References

Shooting at the 1984 Summer Olympics
Men's events at the 1984 Summer Olympics